{|

{{Infobox ship career
|Hide header=
|Ship country=Canada
|Ship flag=
|Ship name=Klahowya (CAN #126946)
|Ship owner=Columbia River Lumber Company
|Ship operator=
|Ship registry=Golden, BC
|Ship route=Inland British Columbia on Columbia River
|Ship ordered=
|Ship builder=Frank P. Armstrong or George Rury<ref name = McCurdy>McCurdy, H.W., ed., H.W. McCurdy Marine History of the Pacific Northwest, at 174, Superior Publishing, Seattle, WA 1966</ref>
|Ship original cost=
|Ship yard number=
|Ship way number=
|Ship laid down= 
|Ship launched=1910 at Golden, BC
|Ship built=
|Ship christened=
|Ship acquired=
|Ship maiden voyage=
|Ship in service=1910
|Ship out of service=1915
|Ship identification=
|Ship fate=Removed from service
|Ship notes=
}}

|}Klahowya was a sternwheel steamer that operated in British Columbia on the Columbia River from 1910 to 1915.  The name "Klahowya" is the standard greeting in the Chinook Jargon.

Design and constructionKlahowya was built at Golden, BC.Klahowyas engines came from Isabella McCormack which had been converted into a houseboat.  Klahowya was built by Capt. Frank P. Armstrong (another source gives George Rury as the builder), with the capacity to carry 100 passengers.  Armstrong built Klahowya  in an unusual way.  When the Columbia River was frozen, Armstrong built the vessel on a set of shipways constructed directly on the ice.  When the boat was finished, Armstrong cut around the outline of the vessel in the ice, and the boat settled into the water.

Two sources state Klahowya was built for the Columbia River Lumber Company, while another source states Klahowya was intended for the increasing tourist trade in the Golden region.  Multiple use steamboats were common, and use for lumbering would not have been necessarily inconsistent with tourist applications.

OperationsKlahowya operated on the Columbia River from Golden to Columbia Lake.  The period of reported operations was brief, from 1910 to 1915.
It is possible that Canada's participation in World War I starting in 1914 helped shorten Klahowya's career.  A number of steamboats in other areas of inland British Columbia had been built to cater to tourism, which was badly affected by war.  Mobilization of men also depressed local businesses such as lumbering, which depended upon their labor.  Captain Armstrong himself went overseas during World War I to supervise steamboat operations in war zones in the Middle East.

Removal from serviceKlahowya is reported to have been withdrawn from service in 1915.

Notes

Further reading

 Faber, Jim, Steamer's Wake—Voyaging down the old marine highways of Puget Sound, British Columbia, and the Columbia River, Enetai Press, Seattle, WA 1985 
 Timmen, Fritz, Blow for the Landing'', Caxton Printers, Caldwell, ID 1972 

Paddle steamers of British Columbia
Steamboats of the Columbia River
Columbia Valley
1910 ships